Franz Pamperl (born 7 September 1897, date of death unknown) was an Austrian bobsledder. He competed in the four-man event at the 1928 Winter Olympics.

References

1897 births
Year of death missing
Austrian male bobsledders
Olympic bobsledders of Austria
Bobsledders at the 1928 Winter Olympics
Place of birth missing